The 2022 Esiliiga was the 32nd season of the Esiliiga, the second tier of Estonian football. The season started on 3 March 2022 and concluded on 13 November 2022.

Teams

Stadiums and locations

Personnel and kits

Managerial changes

League table

Results

Matches 1–18

Matches 19–36

Relegation play-offs

Alliance won 4–3 on aggregate.

Season statistics

Top scorers

Hat-tricks 

Notes
4 Player scored 4 goals(H) – Home team(A) – Away team

Awards

Monthly awards

Esiliiga Player of the Season
Egert Õunapuu was named Esiliiga Player of the Year.

References

External links 
Official website

Esiliiga seasons
2
Estonia
Estonia